The Mercedes-Benz B-Class is a subcompact executive car manufactured and marketed by Mercedes-Benz since 2005. Based on the A-Class with larger dimensions, the European New Car Assessment Programme (Euro NCAP) classifies it as a small MPV.

As of December 20, 2013, delivery of B-Class vehicles reached 1 million since its launch in 2005.

First generation (W245; 2005)

The first generation B-Class was introduced in Europe, Australia, and other parts of the world in spring 2005, and in Canada in autumn 2005. The B-Class uses front-wheel drive with sandwich floor construction, parabolic rear suspension, and a two-box design — one for the drivetrain and another for the shared passenger and luggage compartment. The B-Class maximises its interior volume via its height. Having derived from the smaller A-Class, it retained that car's sandwich floor concept.

All models included  passive automobile safety systems including ESP, ABS, traction control, cornering lights, active lighting system, and headlamp assist. In the event of a frontal impact the engine and transmission slide beneath the passenger compartment.

In 2008 it was updated with a start-stop system and a BlueEFFICIENCY option. A new NGT variant was added, which could burn either gasoline or natural gas.

In 2011 Mercedes-Benz did a world tour with three of its Mercedes-Benz F-Cell vehicles, one of which was the B-Class. The hydrogen-powered fuel cell vehicle was driven more than 30,000 kilometres in a circumnavigation of the globe, starting and ending in Stuttgart.

Engines 
The B160 and B180 conform to Euro V emission standards.  The rest of the engines conform to Euro IV emission standards.  A diesel particulate filter is available as an option for the diesel units (this reduces about 99% of the particle emissions, without the need for additives).

Specifications

Second generation (W246; 2011) 

The second generation B-Class was introduced at the 2011 International Motor Show Germany. European models went on sale in November 2011. Japanese and Australian models went on sale in April 2012, and Canadian models in late 2012 as the 2013 model year. They are assembled at Rastatt, Germany, and from 2011 at Kecskemét, Hungary. By summer 2013, over 230,000 second generation B-Class cars had been delivered.

It included new gasoline and diesel engines, mated to either a six-speed manual or seven-speed dual-clutch transmission. Drag coefficient was lowered, despite growing in overall dimensions to the benefit of interior space. A new four-cylinder engine was introduced with the model, the M270.

Safety systems included adaptive cruise control, blind spot assist and, a collision prevention adaptive brake system.

The vehicle received a facelift in 2015.

Variants and nomenclature 
The last part of the model name indicates how the vehicle is powered:
 Natural Gas Drive: c, e.g. B 200 c (for compressed natural gas)
 Diesel: d, e.g. B 250 d
 Electric: e, e.g. B 250 e
 Fuel cell f, e.g. B 200 f
 All-wheel drive: i.e. B 250 4MATIC

BlueEFFICIENCY 
BlueEFFICIENCY is a term used by Mercedes-Benz for a series of measures which reduce fuel consumption and  emissions. These include:

 Start/stop function switches off the engine temporarily when the vehicle is stationary.
 Alternator management for regenerative braking.
 Tyres optimised for rolling resistance have low energy requirements while driving and also help to reduce fuel consumption. 
The B 180 CDI BlueEFFICIENCY Edition was available from September 2011.

B 200 Natural Gas Drive
Production version includes a choice of manual and 7G-DCT dual clutch transmission, and was available from early 2013. European model was set to go on sale in February 2014.

B-Class Electric Drive 

Initial concept versions of the B-Class Electric Drive were developed under the Mercedes-Benz BlueZERO project using batteries from Li-tec and a drivetrain from Tesla, but Mercedes switched to using a drivetrain developed by Mercedes itself soon after. The Electric Drive was previewed at the 2012 Paris Motor Show, the 2013 New York International Auto Show, and the 2013 IAA International Motor Show 2013. Production for retail customers began in April 2014 at Mercedes-Benz Rastatt factory. In May 2014, Mercedes announced the B-Class Electric Drive will be available in Germany and the UK in the first quarter of 2015. In November, Mercedes-Benz announced pricing for Germany and started accepting orders.

The battery can be charged at any standard domestic 230 V power outlet or 400 V rapid charging terminal.

The B-Class Electric Drive was introduced to the U.S. in December 2013 as an early 2014 model. It is one of the only B-Class models to ever be sold in the U.S. market, as well as being the first Mercedes-Benz vehicle to ever be in an electric variant, though it was only available in certain states that required ZEV mandates. Pricing in the U.S. starts at  before any applicable tax credits and other government incentives. In 2015, over 1,900 electric B-class vehicles were sold in the US, but in 2017, only 4,100 electric B-class vehicles were sold and were shortly discontinued due to low demand. It was originally rebadged as the B-Class Electric Drive, but in 2017, it was renamed the B250e. The energy consumption was rated at 40 kWh/100 miles for combined city/highway driving, corresponding to a fuel economy of 84 miles per gallon gasoline equivalent – MPGe (2.8 L/100 km; 101 mpg imp). The rating for city driving is 85 mpg-e (2.8 L/100 km; 102 mpg imp), and 83 mpg-e (2.8 L/100 km; 100 mpg imp) for highway.

Engines

Third generation (W247; 2019) 

The third generation B-Class was launched at the Paris Motor Show on 2 October 2018. At launch, the vehicle was claimed to feature the Intelligent Drive semi-automated driving system borrowed from the S-Class.

The vehicle received a facelift in 2023.

The design was improved with a much shorter front overhang. The controversial sculpting on the side part of the vehicle was not carried over to the W247 B-Class. Three infotainment system options is available, with entry-level models getting dual seven-inch displays. A seven-inch display with the larger 10.25-inch display is available, with top-tier models getting a pair of the large displays. It is powered by a full MBUX infotainment system, giving B-Class buyers access to its functions through a standard touchscreen. Features such as intelligent voice control, augmented reality, and a head-up display are optional. The all-electric configuration was removed, but a plug-in hybrid option was introduced. The plug-in hybrid comes with a 10.9 kWh battery which optionally supports DC charging and provides a WLTP combined cycle range of 66 km.

References

External links 

 B-Class - Official Mercedes-Benz International page
  Official Mercedes-Benz Canada B200 marketing page 
  Mercedes B-Class Now Sold In Canada 
  Mercedes-Benz B-Class Mercedes-Benz B-Class UK Information
Press kit:
 The B-Class: Heralding a new era in the compact class

B-Class
Cars introduced in 2005
2010s cars
2020s cars
Compact MPVs
Hatchbacks
Front-wheel-drive vehicles
All-wheel-drive vehicles
Euro NCAP small MPVs
Vehicles with CVT transmission
Production electric cars